Mathieu Gourdain (born 4 May 1974) is a French fencer. He won silver medals in the individual and team sabre events at the 2000 Summer Olympics.

References

External links
 

1974 births
Living people
French male sabre fencers
Olympic fencers of France
Fencers at the 2000 Summer Olympics
Olympic silver medalists for France
Olympic medalists in fencing
People from Vernon, Eure
Medalists at the 2000 Summer Olympics
Sportspeople from Eure